Rhadinella is a genus of snakes of the subfamily Dipsadinae.

Geographic range
The genus Rhadinella is endemic to Mexico and Central America.

Species
The following 20 species are recognized as being valid.
Rhadinella anachoreta 
Rhadinella donaji 
Rhadinella dysmica 
Rhadinella godmani 
Rhadinella hannsteini 
Rhadinella hempsteadae 
Rhadinella kanalchutchan 
Rhadinella kinkelini  – Kinkelin's graceful brown snake
Rhadinella lachrymans 
Rhadinella lisyae 
Rhadinella montecristi 
Rhadinella pegosalyta 
Rhadinella pilonaorum 
Rhadinella posadasi 
Rhadinella rogerromani 
Rhadinella schistosa 
Rhadinella serperaster 
Rhadinella stadelmani L. Stuart & Bailey, 1941
Rhadinella tolpanorum 
Rhadinella xerophila  

Nota bene: A binomial authority in parentheses indicates that the species was originally described in a genus other than Rhadinella.

References

Further reading
Smith HM (1941). "A New Genus of Mexican Snakes Related to Rhadinaea". Copeia 1941: 7-10. (Rhadinella, new genus; Rhadinella schistosa, new species).

Dipsadinae
Snake genera